This list is of the Cultural Properties of Japan designated in the category of  for the Prefecture of Okinawa.

National Cultural Properties
As of 1 June 2019, zero properties have been designated as being of national significance.

Prefectural Cultural Properties
As of 1 May 2018, eleven properties have been designated at a prefectural level.

Municipal Cultural Properties
As of 1 May 2018, six properties have been designated at a municipal level.

See also
 Cultural Properties of Japan
 List of National Treasures of Japan (paintings)
 Japanese painting
 List of Museums in Okinawa Prefecture

References

External links
  Cultural Properties in Okinawa Prefecture

Cultural Properties,Okinawa
Cultural Properties,Paintings
Paintings,Okinawa
Lists of paintings